List of the first German railways to 1870 with German railways ordered by date of the commissioning the first phase of construction.  For context see History of rail transport in Germany.

Maps

References

History of rail transport in Germany
Lists of firsts